Macrocheles terreus is a species of mite in the family Macrochelidae.

References

terreus
Articles created by Qbugbot
Animals described in 1877